McCall Municipal Airport  is a city-owned public-use airport located in McCall, a city in Valley County, Idaho, United States. It is included in the FAA's National Plan of Integrated Airport Systems for 2011–2015, which categorized it as a general aviation facility.

It is home to a U.S. Forest Service smokejumper base, one of eight in the nation.

The airport was the site of a fatal crash in 2008 on May 2, when two single-engine planes collided on final approach to runway 34 and exploded, resulting in three deaths.

Facilities and aircraft 

For the 12-month period ending August 13, 2010, the airport had 43,600 aircraft operations, an average of 119 per day: 84% general aviation, 16% air taxi, and <1% military. At that time there were 94 aircraft based at this airport: 82% single-engine, 14% multi-engine, 3% jet, and 1% helicopter.

References

External links 
 McCall Municipal Airport at City of McCall website
 Aerial photo as of 4 September 1998 from USGS The National Map
 

Airports in Idaho
Buildings and structures in Valley County, Idaho
Transportation in Valley County, Idaho